Sanderia is a genus of jellyfish in the family Pelagiidae. There are two species recognized.

Species
Sanderia malayensis Goette, 1886
Sanderia pampinosus Gershwin & Zeidler, 2008

References

Pelagiidae
Scyphozoan genera